Seven countries have hosted and co-hosted the Rugby League World Cup. England, France, Australia and New Zealand have hosted the World Cup on multiple occasions and the tournament has never been played outside its traditional 'heartlands' in these areas. The International Rugby League is responsible for picking hosts. From 1954 to 2008 World Cups were sporadic and hosts were picked and tournaments were arranged between the four traditional rugby league playing countries and the IRL. From 2013 and beyond countries have to send an application to the IRL to host the World Cup as more teams participate in international rugby league.

List of hosts

Host bids

2013
Bids:

 / 
Australia bid for the 2013 World Cup following their success of hosting the 2008 World Cup. The Rugby Football League (RFL) also submitted a bid for England and Wales to host the World Cup for the first time since 2000. The RFL bid was later accepted.

Winners:  /

2017
Bids:
 /  / 
 South Africa
South Africa bid to host the 2017 World Cup hoping to be the first African nation to host a rugby league World Cup believing that they help grow the game internationally. Australia also bid for the hosting rights again but with the help of New Zealand to co host. The RLIF accepted Australia and New Zealand's bid to host the 2017 World Cup as there would be more chance of the tournament being a success although South Africa was praised for their growing domestic game.

Winners:  /  /

2021
Bids:

 / 
The UAERL believed the country has the facilities, as well as the financial backing and infrastructure to host the World Cup. The bid was later cancelled after rugby union officials in the UAE had the leader of the bid arrested for "managing a sporting body which is not registered and therefore not recognised by the relevant government authority".
South Africa also expressed interest in hosting the tournament, but did not bid.

On 25 November 2015 England’s RFL announced it had government backed plans to host the 2021 World Cup after the success of 2013. The RFL put in an official bid for the 2021 World Cup on 30 June 2016 with £15m funding from the government and the aim to have over 1 million spectators. The USARL put a bid in with the hope to grow the sport throughout North America.

Winners:

2025
Bids:
/

The 2025 World Cup was recommended by the IRL to be hosted in the USA and Canada. However due to the organisers Moore Sports encountering financial difficulties they were stripped of the hosting. The IRL then went on the recommend France who in July 2021 officially bid to host the World Cup.

Winners:

2029
Potential Bids:

After failing to win in 2017 and pulling out of hosting 2025 a new governing body, Championship Rugby League, which is not associated with the USARL or NARL has expressed interest in hosting the 2029 World Cup. However in a 2022 interview IRL chairman Troy Grant said that a USA World Cup was more likely to be held in 2033 due to infighting and unrest between the USARL and other governing bodies in the US.

///
Grant stated that New Zealand were keen on hosting the 2029 World Cup potentially with Australia but more likely as part of a Pacific World Cup with games played in Tonga, Samoa, Vanuatu and potentially Hawaii.

2033
Potential Bids:
 
The USA are expected to bid for a third time in a row with strong support for them to host a future World Cup.

Total bids by country
World Cup-winning bids are bolded. Withdrawn bids are crossed out. Rejected bids, as well as planned but not-yet-official bids for 2029 and beyond, are not included.

References

External links

hosts
Rugby league-related lists